Nicolas Isouard (also known as Nicolò, Nicolò Isoiar or Nicolò de Malte; 18 May 1773 – 23 March 1818) was a Maltese-born French composer.

Biography
Born in Porto Salvo, Valletta, Malta, Isouard studied in Rabat or Mdina with Francesco Azopardi, in Palermo with Giuseppe Amendola, and in Naples with Nicola Sala and Pietro Alessandro Guglielmi. From 1795 he was organist at St. John de Gerusalemme in Valletta at the Conventual Church of the Order of Saint John, San Giovanni di Malta.

He moved to Paris, where he worked as a free composer and became friends with Rodolphe Kreutzer. The pair worked together on several operas, including Le Petit page, ou La Prison d'état (1800) and Flaminius à Corinthe (1801). Isouard adopted the pseudonym Nicolò (or Nicolò de Malte) and found rapid success in the field of opéra comique with Michel-Ange (1802) and L'Intrigue aux fenêtres (1805). He composed regularly for the Théâtre de l'Opéra-Comique, writing some thirty works for it.

He composed masses, motets, cantatas, romances, and duos, along with over 45 operas.

Family and legacy

Isouard had two daughters, Sophie-Nicole (1809–1885), a composer of romances, and Annette-Julie (1814–1876), a pianist and composer. His brother Joseph (1794–1863) had a career as a singer and opera director before being named inspector of historic monuments in Rouen. Nicolas Isouard died in Paris and was buried in Notre-Dame-des-Victoires. A bust of the composer was placed on one of the facades of both the Théâtre de l'Opéra-Comique and the Palais Garnier, and one of the main squares in Paris was given his name.

Works
 Casaciello, perseguitato da un Mago, Opera buffa - Two-act comedy 1793, Malta
 L'avviso a Maritati, Opera,  Florence June1794
 Artaserse, re di Persia, Opera seria, Livorno August 1794. Two excerpts only survive. Edited by Richard Divall
 Il barbiere di Siviglia, Opera buffa after Pierre Beaumarchais, Malta Teatro Manoel 1796
 Rinaldo d'Asti, Dramma giocoso, Malta 1796
 L'improvvisata in campagna,  Opera buffa, Malta 1796-7
 I due avari, Commedia per musica, Malta 1797
 Il bottaio, Opera comique, 1798
 Il barone d'Alba chiara, Commedia per musica, Carnevale, Malta 1798
 Ginevra di Scozia, Dramma serio eroico, 1798
 Le Petit page, ou La Prison d'état, Opera, Paris, February 1801
 Flaminius à Corinthe,  Opera, Paris February 1801
 Le Tonellier' Opera-comique, Paris May 1801
 L'Impromptu de campagne', Opera-comique, Paris June 1801
 La Statue, ou La Femme avare, Opera comique, 1802
 Michel-Ange, Opera, 1802
 Les Confidences, Opera, 1803
 Le Baiser et la quittance, ou Une Aventure de garnison, Opera comique, 1803
 Le Médecin turc, Opéra bouffon, 1803
 L'Intrigue aux fenêtres, Opera, 1805
 La Ruse inutile, ou Les Rivaux par convention, Opera,  1805
 Léonce, ou Le Fils adoptif, Opera, 1805
 La Prise de Passaw, Opera comique,  1806
 Le Déjeuner de garçons, Comédie mêlée de musique, 1806
 Idala, ou La Sultane, Opera comique, 1806
 Les Rendez-vous bourgeois, Opéra bouffon, 1807
 Les Créanciers, ou Le Remède à la goutte, Opera comique, 1807
 Un Jour à Paris, ou La Leçon singulière, Opera comique, 1808
 Cimarosa, Opera comique, 1808
 Zélomir, ou L'Intrigue au sérail, Opera comique, 1809
 Cendrillon, Opéra féerie after Charles Perrault, 1810
 La Victime des arts, ou La Fête de famille, Opera comique, 1811
 La Fête de village, ou L'Heureux militaire, Opera comique, 1811
 Le Billet de loterie, Opera comique, 1811
 Le mMagicien sans magie, Opera comique,  1811
 Lulli et Quinault, ou Le Déjeuner impossible, Opera comique, 1812
 Le Prince de Catane, ou Alamon, Opera, 1813
 Le Français à Venise, Opera comique, 1813
 Bayard à Mézières, ou Le Siège de Mézières, Opera comique, 1814
 Joconde, ou Les Coureurs d'aventures, Opera comique, 1814
 Jeannot et Colin, Opera comique, 1814
 Les Deux maris, Opera comique, 1816
 L'Une pour l'autre, ou L'Enlèvement, Opera comique, 1816
 Les Deux capitaines de hussards Opera-coiique, Paris March 1817
 Aladin, ou La Lampe merveilleuse, Opéra féerie, 1822
 Une Nuit de Gustave Wasa, Opera, 1825

Sacred works - all with orchestra and voices (In alphabetical order). Original Manuscripts - Bibliothèque Nationale, Paris
 Angelus Domini
 Credo Leg a 4 Voci 1795
 De torrente in A flat major
 De torrente in B flat major
 Diffusa est Gratia
 Dixit Dominus a 4
 Dixit Dominus Leg
 Dominus Deus a Terzetto
 Gloria in D
 Gratia agimus tibi in E flat
 Gloria Patri in E flat
 Kyrie in E flat
 Kyrie in C minor
 Kyrie Messa no 2 in E flat - fragment
 Juravit Dominus
 Lauda Jerusalem
 Laetatus sum
 Magnificat
 Missa a Quattro Voci 1790 ( attr. to another composer) Cospicua Archives
 Missa Pro Defunctorum - Jommelli, orchestrated by Isouard (Brussels Conservatoire Library)
 Nisi Dominus
 Panis Angelicus
 Qui Tollis
 Quoniam Tu Solus
 Salve Regina
 Sinfonia in C minor
 Stabat Mater (5 fragments) Suscepimus Deus
 Te Deum 1791
 Vexilla Regis
 Virgam Virtutis for tenor and bass duet
 Virgam Virtutis for solo tenor
 Virtute Magna

All of the above have been edited by Richard Divall and are available from the University of Divinity, Australia. Richard Divall is currently preparing a publication of a monograph and complete thematic catalogue, and an edition of the opera Cendrillon.

Further reading

References

External links

1775 births
1818 deaths
18th-century classical composers
18th-century French composers
18th-century French male musicians
19th-century classical composers
19th-century French composers
19th-century French male musicians
Composers for piano
French male classical composers
French opera composers
Male opera composers
Maltese classical composers
Maltese opera composers
People from Valletta